The Orto Botanico di Firenze (2.3 hectares), also known as the Giardino dei Semplici, the "Garden of simples", is a botanical garden maintained by the University of Florence. It is located at Via Micheli, 3, Florence, Italy, and open weekday mornings. 

The garden was established on December 1, 1545, by Cosimo I de' Medici, Grand Duke of Tuscany, and is Europe's third oldest, behind the Orto Botanico di Pisa and the Orto Botanico di Padova. It was first laid out by landscape gardener Niccolò Pericoli to a botanical system and plantings chosen by Luca Ghini, and rose to prominence under Cosimo III, with Pier Antonio Micheli as its director. As was typical of early European botanical gardens, its prime interest was in medicinal plants. However, as in 1753 the Società Botanica was formed, the garden's focus turned to "experimental agriculture" and its layout was revised accordingly. The garden grounds opened to the public in the mid-19th century, at about the same time that its glass houses (1694 m²) were constructed.

Today the garden contains some 9,000 plant specimens laid out in a roughly square site surrounded by walls, crossed by a grid of walkways, and with a central fountain. Some trees are quite old, including a Taxus baccata (1720) and Quercus suber (1805). Other species include:

Notes

See also 
 List of botanical gardens in Italy
 Museo di Storia Naturale di Firenze
Certosa di Pisa

External links 
Giardino dei semplici - Museo di Storia Naturale di Firenze
Giardino dei semplici -  Gruppo di Lavoro per gli Orti Botanici ed i Giardini Storici della Società Botanica Italiana
Botanical Garden Florence

1545 establishments in Italy
Botanical gardens in Italy
University of Florence
Gardens in Florence
Tourist attractions in Florence
Museo di Storia Naturale di Firenze